Dick Aboud (July 24, 1941 – February 15, 2000), born Richard Aboud, was a Canadian football linebacker and offensive lineman for the Montreal Alouettes and Toronto Argonauts.

References 

1941 births
2000 deaths
Canadian football linebackers
Canadian football offensive linemen
Tulsa Golden Hurricane football players
Montreal Alouettes players
Toronto Argonauts players
Players of Canadian football from Quebec
Canadian football people from Montreal